Marvin Farber (December 14, 1901 – November 24, 1980) was an American philosopher and educator.

Early life and education
He was born in Buffalo, New York to Jewish parents Simon and Matilda (Goldstein) Farber.  He was the second oldest of their 14 children. One of his brothers was pathologist and cancer researcher Sidney Farber.

Initially a music student at the University of Buffalo, but he transferred in 1920 to Harvard University, graduating summa cum laude with his bachelor's degree in philosophy in 1922. He earned his Ph.D. in 1925 at Harvard. He also attended German universities of Berlin, Heidelberg, and Freiburg, studying under Edmund Husserl, Martin Heidegger, Heinrich Rickert, and Ernst Zermelo, among others.

Career
Farber taught for a year at Ohio State University between his studies in Germany. He then taught at his initial alma mater, the University at Buffalo, from 1927 to 1961 and 1964–1974; during the interim, he was Chairman of the Department of Philosophy at the University of Pennsylvania. After his first year at University of Buffalo, he was appointed Assistant Professor. He founded the journal Philosophy and Phenomenological Research in 1940 and was its editor until 1980. He was Chairman of the Department of Philosophy from 1937 to 1961. He was designated Professor Emeritus in 1974 and retired in 1977.

Personal life and demise
He died in Minneapolis, Minnesota after months of serious illness. He was survived by his loving wife Lorraine and three children, Lawrence, Roger and Carol.

Honors and awards
 Guggenheim Fellowship, 1944–45
 Docteur de l'Universitė de Lille, 1955
 President, American Philosophical Association (Eastern Division), 1963

Bibliography
 Naturalism and Subjectivism, 1959 
 Phenomenology and Existence: Toward a Philosophy within Nature, 1967. 
 The Search for an Alternative: Philosophical Perspectives of Subjectivism and Marxism, 1984. 
 The Foundation of Phenomenology: Edmund Husserl and the Quest for a Rigorous Science of Philosophy, 2006.

See also
American philosophy
List of American philosophers

Notes

External links
 Journal of Philosophy and Phenomenological Research at Brown University
 Catalog of Marvin Farber papers at the University at Buffalo

1901 births
1980 deaths
Jewish American academics
Jewish philosophers
Harvard University alumni
University at Buffalo faculty
20th-century American philosophers
People from Buffalo, New York
20th-century American Jews